Alba García (born 12 July 1992) is a Spanish actress, best known for her role in 2011 fantasy film Verbo.

Filmography

Film

Television

References

External links

1999 births
Living people
Spanish film actresses
21st-century Spanish actresses